Haploa reversa, the reversed haploa, is a moth of the family Erebidae. The species was first described by Stretch in 1885. It is found in North America, from south-eastern Illinois, Iowa, Kansas, New York, Oklahoma and Wisconsin.

The wingspan is about 33 mm. Adults are white with a pattern of brown lines in two triangles on the forewing. The hindwings are clear white. There are two forms, one of which has reversed markings. Adults are on wing in June in one generation per year.

The larvae feed on a wide range of plants, including Malus species (apple trees). They are variable and black with a pale dorsal line and bluish tubercles. They have white or a white with black hair.

References

Moths described in 1885
Callimorphina
Moths of North America